This is a list of champions in the World Victory Road organization at each weight class.

Title histories

Middleweight Championship
Weight limit: 85 kg (185.2 lb)

Welterweight Championship
Weight limit: 77 kg (169.7 lb)

Lightweight Championship
Weight limit: 70 kg (154.3 lb)

Featherweight Championship
Weight limit: 65 kg (143.3 lb)

Tournament Winners

See also
List of current mixed martial arts champions
List of Sengoku events
Mixed martial arts weight classes

References

Sengoku Champions, List Of